Czech Republic–Iran relations are bilateral relations between the Czech Republic and Iran.

History
Czech–Iranian relations were established on April 30, 1929.

Trade and economy
As of 2014, Czech firms mainly exported machinery products, electrical goods, and other products to Iran while the bulk of imports from Iran consisted of fruit and vegetables. The Czech Republic and Iran cooperate in nuclear technology and in fields of energy, mining and commerce.

Diplomatic missions

Iran has an embassy in Prague.
Czech Republic has an embassy in Tehran.

See also
Foreign relations of the Czech Republic
Foreign relations of Iran
Iran–European Union relations
List of diplomatic missions of the Czech Republic
List of diplomatic missions of Iran

References

 
Iran
Czech Republic